The Goulet River (in French: rivière Goulet'') is a tributary of the Vermillon River, flowing on the west side of the Saint-Maurice River, in the administrative region of the Mauricie, in Quebec, in Canada. The course of this river crosses the territories of:
 La Tuque: canton of Frémont;
 Mékinac Regional County Municipality (MRC): unorganized territory of Lac-Normand: canton of Sincennes and canton of Dupuis.

The course of this river descends from the mountains entirely in a forest environment. Since the end of the XIXth, forestry has been the main economic activity in the Goulet River watershed.

Geography 
The Goulet river takes its source at the mouth of Gingras lake in the township of Frémont. This head lake is located in a mountainous area, on the west side of Creek Valley. This source is located at:
  north of the confluence of the Goulet river;
  north-east of the village center of Manawan;
  west of downtown La Tuque.

  towards the south in the township of Frémont, to the outlet of Lake Kent (coming from the east);
  towards the southwest, crossing Lake Louise and collecting the water from the landfill (coming from the northwest) of the lac Jacob), to the northeast shore of lac Sam;
  towards the southeast, crossing Sam Lake;
  towards the south, collecting the waters of the discharge (coming from the southeast) of Lightning Lake, to the limit of the township of Sincennes;
  towards the south-east, crossing Canaple Lake along its full length, to its mouth;
  southeasterly, to the limit of the township of Dupuis;
  towards the south, collecting water from the discharge (coming from the northeast) of Desert Lake, to the north shore of Jimmy Lake;
  south, crossing Jimmy Lake, to the dam located at its mouth;
  towards the southwest, crossing Lac Léo (length: altitude), up to the limit of Lac Dupuis;
  towards the south-east, crossing Lake Dupuis, up to its mouth which constitutes the confluence of the Goulet River.

The Goulet River flows into a river curve on the north bank of the Vermillon River. This confluence is located in the township of Dupuis, in the unorganized territory of Lac-Normand, in the Mékinac Regional County Municipality. This confluence is located at:
  southeast of the confluence of the Vermillon river;
  east of the center of Manawan village;
  to the north-west of the limit of the Saint-Maurice Wildlife Reserve.

Toponymy 
The toponym Goulet River was formalized on December 5, 1968, at the Commission de toponymie du Québec.

See also 
 List of rivers of Quebec

References 

Landforms of La Tuque, Quebec
Mékinac Regional County Municipality